Abdul Hyee (born 1 May 1952) is an Awami League politician and the incumbent Jatiya Sangsad member representing the Jhenaidah-1 constituency since 2001. He served as the State Minister of Fisheries and Livestock during 2012–2013.

Early life and education 
Hyee was born in Shailkupa Upazila, Jhenaidah District in 1952. Hyee passed the SSC exams in 1967 and passed HSC in 1969. He has completed his Bachelor of Arts degree from KC College in 1973.

Career
Hyee was involved in politics from his high school life. He joined the Bangladesh Chhatra League during his college life. In 1969, he was elected VP of KC College Chatra Sangshad (Student Union). He played an active role in the Six point movement and later the Eleven point movement in 1969.  In 1971, he joined the Liberation war of Bangladesh as the commander of Shailkupa Upazila Mujib Bahini.

Hyee was the last president of East Pakistan Student League of Jhenaidah District & first president of Bangladesh Student League of Jhenaidah District. He was the one who raised the National Flag of Bangladesh in Jhenaidah in 2 March 1971 under the command of Sheikh Mujibur Rahman. He was the vice president of Khulna Division Student League.Later he was the member of Bangladesh Krishak League, central Executive Committee.

He was the founding president of Jhenaidah District Jubo League & member of the Bangladesh Awami Jubo League central executive Committee with the Founder of Bangladesh Awami Jubo League Sheikh Fazlul Haque Mani in 1972.He holds the position of the president of Jhenaidah District Student League & Jhenaidah District Jubo League more than Six month at the same time.

In 1996, Hyee was nominated as the acting General Secretary of Jhenadah District Awaami League. Later he was the convenor of Jhenaidah District Awaami League.In 2008, he was nominated as the president of Bangladesh Awami League of Jhenaidah District.

Hyee was nominated by Bangladesh Awami League and was elected a Member of parliament in 2001 from the constituency 81: Jhenaidah-1, Shailkupa Upazila. In 2008, he was elected member of parliament for the second term and later was appointed as the State minister of Ministry of Fisheries and Livestock. He was elected is in his third term in Parliament in January 2014. He has been elected Member of Parliament in his fourth term in 2019 respectively from Shailkupa Upazila.

Controversy
According to The Daily Star, several politicians complained that Hyee had been engaged in irregularities in sending people abroad. The police had seized Hyee's passport at the Zia International Airport (now Shahjalal International Airport) when another person used the passport to travel.

References

1952 births
Living people
People from Jhenaidah District
8th Jatiya Sangsad members
9th Jatiya Sangsad members
10th Jatiya Sangsad members
11th Jatiya Sangsad members
State Ministers of Fisheries and Livestock
Mukti Bahini personnel